Birchwood is an unincorporated community in Hamilton and Meigs counties in Tennessee, United States. It is a rural area located along Tennessee State Route 60 and Tennessee State Route 312 (Birchwood Pike) northwest of  Chattanooga. It is part of the Chattanooga, TN–GA Metropolitan Statistical Area.

According to the 2021 American Community Survey the 37308 Zip Code Tabulation Area had a total population of 2,431.

Culture and tourism
Birchwood is known as the location of the Tennessee Sandhill Crane Festival, generally held annually in January at the Hiwassee Wildlife Refuge. The area was a stopping point along the Trail of Tears, memorialized by the Cherokee Removal Memorial Park and nearby Blythe Ferry.

Much of Birchwood, along with nearby communities in the eastern part of Hamilton County, was once part of James County, Tennessee.

References

Unincorporated communities in Tennessee
Unincorporated communities in Hamilton County, Tennessee